Serhiy Tahirov ( born 2 January 1989 in Dnipropetrovsk, Ukrainian SSR, Soviet Union) is a Ukrainian weightlifter. He competed at the 2012 Summer Olympics in the -105 kg event, finishing in 10th with a total of 374 kg.

References

Sportspeople from Dnipro
Ukrainian male weightlifters
Olympic weightlifters of Ukraine
Weightlifters at the 2012 Summer Olympics
1989 births
Living people
20th-century Ukrainian people
21st-century Ukrainian people